Peter M. Lenkov (born 9 May 1964) is a Canadian television and film writer, producer, and comic book author. He is best known as the showrunner of the reboot series Hawaii Five-0, MacGyver, and Magnum P.I., all of which aired on CBS when he was showrunner.

Early life
Lenkov was born in Montreal, Quebec, Canada in 1964 and he studied film at Concordia University in the 1980s. His family includes a younger brother, Jeff, who is a California-based lawyer, sports agent and professor.

Career and awards
Lenkov's notable work includes the TV series La Femme Nikita, Hawaii Five-0, 24 and CSI: NY and films such as R.I.P.D., Demolition Man and Son in Law. In comics, he wrote R.I.P.D. and Fort: Prophet of the Unexplained, for which he was nominated for the Bram Stoker Award for Best Illustrated Narrative. In 2005, he was nominated for an Emmy Award for his work on the hit TV series 24. In 2009, he wrote an episode of CSI: NY for which acclaimed actor Ed Asner was nominated for an Emmy for Guest Star. In 2011, Hawaii Five-0 was awarded Best New Drama at the People's Choice Awards. Other awards include a CAPE Award for Best Drama for Hawaii Five-0, a Media Access Award for his work on CSI: NY and a Huntington Disease Honor for an episode of The District.

In 2010, Lenkov launched his reboot of the long-running CBS series Hawaii Five-0, which formerly aired on CBS and in over 200 countries around the world. He also created "Metajets" and "Kung Fu Dino Posse", two new animated TV shows. Lenkov executive produced the NBC mini-series entitled XIII, based on the popular graphic novel and video game by the same name. XIII stars Stephen Dorff and Val Kilmer. The two part film served as a pilot for a cable TV series XIII which began airing in 2011. In 2011, a feature film based on R.I.P.D. began shooting. R.I.P.D. starred Jeff Bridges, Ryan Reynolds and Kevin Bacon, and was released by Universal in summer 2013. In 2011, he signed a deal with CBS TV Studios.

In 2022, Lenkov was the executive producer of four feature films: The Wind & The Reckoning, Shelter In Solitude, Marlowe and R.I.P.D. 2. Lenkov is also developing numerous properties, including writing a new graphic novel.

In 2021, Lenkov also purchased a minority interest in several minor league sports teams.

Allegations and termination
Lenkov was fired from his CBS shows on 7 July 2020 due to reports that he fostered a "toxic work environment". MacGyver star Lucas Till reported being suicidal due to Lenkov's body shaming.

Credits

Writer 
 Demolition Man (1993)
 Son in Law (1993)
 Universal Soldier II: Brothers in Arms (1998)
 Universal Soldier III: Unfinished Business (1998)
 Dr. Jekyll and Mr. Hyde (1999)
 Ballistic: Ecks vs. Sever (2002; uncredited rewrites)

Producer 
 Son in Law (1993)
 Jury Duty (1995)
 Chairman of the Board (1998)
 Ballistic: Ecks vs. Sever (2002)
 Pursued (2003)
 XIII (2008)
 R.I.P.D. (2013)

TV

Writer/producer

Writer (animated)
 Metajets (2009)
 Kung Fu Dino Posse (2009)

Comics
 Fort: Prophet of the Unexplained (with Frazer Irving, 4 part mini-series, Dark Horse Comics, 2003  Titan Books, 2003 )
 R.I.P.D. 2001

References

External links

 
 
 Peter Lenkov interview with www.mycoven.com, June 2011

Lenkov-verse
Canadian male screenwriters
Canadian television writers
Canadian comics writers
Living people
Writers from Montreal
Concordia University alumni
Showrunners
Canadian people of Bulgarian descent
1964 births
20th-century Canadian screenwriters
20th-century Canadian male writers
21st-century Canadian screenwriters
21st-century Canadian male writers